Isaac Gordon (born 7 October 1986) is a former Indigenous Australian professional rugby league footballer. He previously played for the Cronulla-Sutherland Sharks of the National Rugby League.

Playing career
Born in Brewarrina, New South Wales, Gordon played his junior football for the Brewarrina Goo-Gars, Waratah Mayfield Cheetahs and Cessnock Goannas.  Gordon played for The North Sydney Bears in The 2007 and 2008 NSW Cup making 14 appearances before being signed by the Cronulla-Sutherland Sharks.

In Round 1 of the 2010 NRL season Gordon made his NRL debut for Cronulla-Sutherland against the Melbourne Storm.

After the 2012 season, Gordon was released by Cronulla.

Personal life
He is the second cousin of former Newcastle Knights player Ashley Gordon.

On 25 January 2012, Gordon pleaded guilty in Sutherland Court to attacking his former partner, Karen Lee Davidson who was pregnant at the time of the assault, after he came home from a drunken night out with teammates. The NRL stood him down for nine matches.

References

1986 births
Living people
Australian rugby league players
Cessnock Goannas players
Cronulla-Sutherland Sharks players
North Sydney Bears NSW Cup players
Indigenous Australian rugby league players
Rugby league wingers
Rugby league fullbacks
Rugby league players from New South Wales
Waratah Mayfield Cheetahs players